Radojevo is a village in Serbia. It is situated in the municipality of Nova Crnja, Central Banat District, Vojvodina province. The village has a Serb ethnic majority (78.98%) and its population is 1,385 people (2002 census).

Name

In Serbian, the village is known as Radojevo or Радојево (formerly also Klarija / Кларија, Srpska Klarija / Српска Кларија or Peterda / Петерда), in Hungarian as Klári, in German as Klari, in Croatian as Radojevo or Hrvatska Klarija, and in Romanian as Peterda.

History 
Historically, the village was called Klarija, and before merging, there were two Klarija's: Srpska Klarija (Serb Klarija) and Hrvatska Klarija (Croat Klarija).

In Hungarian sources these were called Szerbklári and Horvátklári (located in 20° 47' 21" E and 45° 44' 48" N), respectively.
Hrvatska Klarija got its name after Croatian settlers (nobles that originated from Turopolje), that were settled there by the Diocese of Zagreb on its possessions (see Hrvatska Keča, Hrvatski Čenej). These Croats lived in compact part of the village; they have been slowly but evidently in large amounts assimilated. Still, this assimilation hasn't drawn the attention of Croat parties in Serbia.

The village changed its name after the WW2 and there is an initiative to give to the village its original name Srpska Klarija.

Historical population

1900: 3,107
1931: 3,336
1961: 2,595
1971: 2,230
1981: 1,872
1991: 1,588

Gallery

See also

List of places in Serbia
List of cities, towns and villages in Vojvodina

References

 Slobodan Ćurčić, Broj stanovnika Vojvodine, Novi Sad, 1996.

Populated places in Serbian Banat